Xolmis is a genus of South American birds in the tyrant flycatcher family Tyrannidae.

These are relative large flycatchers that are found in fairly open habitats. Most have black, grey and white plumage.

Species
The genus contains two species:

References

 
Bird genera
Taxonomy articles created by Polbot